Albion is the eleventh studio album by the melodic hard rock band Ten. The album was released on 21 November 2014 and derives its name from the name for the collective British Isles from the time of Queen Boadicia. According to the band, the album was another first for Ten with the release of a limited edition double gatefold vinyl album, which included a large number of highly collectable items. The leading singles from the album were the tracks "'Die For Me" and "Alone In The Dark Tonight".

The album cover was illustrated by Gaetano Di Falco, who also illustrated the band's next studio album, Isla De Muerta.

Track listing
All songs written by Gary Hughes.
 Alone In The Dark Tonight - 4:25
 Battlefield - 5:00
 It's Alive - 5:02
 Albion Born - 5:24
 Sometimes Love Takes The Long Way Home - 5:14
 A Smuggler's Tale - 5:57
 It Ends This Day - 5:37
 Die For Me - 7:28
 Gioco D'Amore - 4:59
 Wild Horses - 5:55
Asian version (Avalon Records MICP-11194) adds
 Good God In Heaven What Hell Is This - 4:00

Personnel
Gary Hughes – vocals, guitars, backing vocals
 Dann Rosingana – lead guitars
 Steve Grocott - lead guitars
John Halliwell – rhythm Guitars
Darrel Treece-Birch – keyboards, programming
Steve Mckenna – bass guitar
 Max Yates – drums and percussion

Production
Produced by Gary Hughes
Mixing and mastering by Dennis Ward

Concepts
 The song "Alone In The Dark Tonight" is based on Emily Brontë's book Wuthering Heights. 
 "A Smuggler's Tale" is based on Daphne Du Maurier's Jamaica Inn (novel).

Chart positions

References

Ten (band) albums
2014 albums